James L. Halperin (born October 31, 1952) is an American businessman and author, who is the co-founder and co-chairman of Heritage Auctions, now the largest American auction house with 2022 sales in excess of $1.45 billion.  In 1985 Halperin authored a text on grading coins, How to Grade U.S. Coins, upon which the grading standards of the grading services PCGS and NGC were ultimately based. He is the author of two futurist fiction books, The Truth Machine (1996) and The First Immortal (1997), which were in 2001 both chosen by PC Magazine in a survey put out to their online newsletter subscribers, as possible responses for the top 17 science/technology fiction books of the previous 20 years. In the 1980s he and his businesses were investigated by federal agencies (including the Federal Trade Commission), which investigation was settled by signing consent decrees and agreeing to pay a substantial fine.

Early life 
Halperin was born on October 31, 1952 in Boston, Massachusetts, to a lower-middle-class Jewish family. At the age of 13, Halperin created a fraudulent mail-order advertising business, which took out ads in magazines looking for people who would pay to join his nonexistent sales network. This scheme drew the attention of the United States Postal Inspection Service. Halperin would end up avoiding charges in exchange for returning $100,000 of the ill-gotten money. At age 16, as a Summer project in 1969 Halperin opened a stamp & coin shop in Cochituate, Massachusetts. The business was almost immediately somewhat profitable.  He graduated from Middlesex School in Concord, Massachusetts in 1970, then attended Harvard College between 1970 and 1971 where he studied psychology and later philosophy. After three semesters, Halperin dropped out to pursue a full-time career in numismatics, and founded New England Rare Coin Galleries (NERCG) in Framingham, Massachusetts.

Career
In 1976 he established a rare coin fund for investors, New England Rare Coin Fund (NERCF) which raised $367,500 for Halperin to invest in rare coins. The Fund was successfully liquidated in April 1980 via public auction, realizing $2,158,450. Every $15,000 unit-holder received over $69,000 after fees on a 3.5-year investment with the 360% profit taxable at capital gain rate.  In 1982, he sold part of NERCG to a former employee, Dana Willis; Willis's company went bankrupt in 1987, after the FTC charged Willis with fraud for overvaluing coins and selling them at inflated prices. During the period Willis was allegedly engaged in fraud, he paid Halperin around $1 million in consulting fees. Halperin later returned some of the money, denied involvement in Willis's wrongdoing, and claimed that the money he got from Willis was part of the terms of his sale.

In 1982, Halperin entered into a 50-50 business partnership with renowned numismatist-turned-businessman Steve Ivy and settled in Dallas, Texas. Halperin and Ivy still co-direct Heritage Auctions of Dallas, which advertises itself as the world's largest rare coin company and largest American auction house, with annual sales above $1.45 billion as of 2022.

In 1984, Halperin founded the coin grading agency Numismatic Certification Institute. NCI went out of business shortly after the FTC found in 1989 that Halperin was giving inflated grades to coins. The overvalued coins were marketed through a Heritage Auctions-backed company named Certified Rare Coin Galleries, which used infomercials to sell silver and gold U.S. coins for more than twice their actual value. Heritage Auctions agreed to pay $1.2 million in restitution, though Halperin continues to insist that most of the coin grades he gave during those times were valid and would still hold up today.

A profile on Halperin appeared in Forbes in 2004, to which Halperin posted an annotated (clarified and/or corrected in footnotes) version on Heritage's website.

In 2019, Halperin, along with Zac Gieg, the founder and owner of Just Press Play Video Games, and video game collector Rich Lecce, purchased a copy of Super Mario Bros from Nintendo's test market launch in 1985 from his Heritage Auctions auction house for $100,150, which at the time set a new auction world record for a graded video game.

Personal life
Halperin also endows The James & Gayle Halperin Foundation, which supports health, arts and education-related charities.

He has been married to his wife Gayle since 1984 and they have two sons, David (born 1991) and Michael (born 1995).

His niece is Molly DeWolf Swenson, American Idol Season 10 contestant and co-founder of RYOT (sold to Huffington Post / AOL in 2016).

References

External links
 James L. Halperin autobiography
 The Truth Machine: free download
 The First Immortal: free download
 How to Grade U.S. Coins
 2004 Forbes Top Drawer, Anotated
 The Collector's Handbook

1952 births
Living people
20th-century American novelists
American information and reference writers
American male novelists
American numismatists
American science fiction writers
Harvard University alumni
Writers from Boston
People from Dallas
Middlesex School alumni
20th-century American male writers
Novelists from Massachusetts
20th-century American non-fiction writers
American male non-fiction writers